Dana may refer to:

People

Given name 
 Dana (given name)

Surname 
 Dana (surname)
 Dana family of Cambridge, Massachusetts
 James Dwight Dana (1813–1895), scientist, zoological author abbreviation Dana

Nickname or stage name 
 Dana International, stage name of singer Sharon Cohen
 Dana Shum, the Shaw Brothers Hong Kong actress from 1973 to 1979
 Dana, stage name of Dana Rosemary Scallon (born 1951), Irish singer and former politician
 Dana (South Korean singer) (born 1986), South Korean pop singer

Places

Ancient world 
 Ancient Dana or Tyana in Cappadocia, capital of a Neo-Hittite kingdom in the 1st millennium BC
 Ancient Dana possibly associated with Tynna in Cappadocia

Canada 
 CFS Dana, a former military radar installation in Saskatchewan, Canada
 Dana Lake, a lake in Eeyou Istchee Baie-James, Quebec, Canada

Ethiopia 
 Dana, Ethiopia, a village

Iran 
 Dana County, an administrative subdivision of Iran
 Dana Rural District, an administrative subdivision of Iran

Jordan 
 Dana, Jordan, a town
 Dana Biosphere Reserve, the largest nature reserve in Jordan

Nepal 
 Dana, Nepal, a village development committee

Pakistan 
 Dana, Khyber Pakhtunkhwa

Poland 
 Dana, Pomeranian Voivodeship, a village

Syria 
 Al-Dana, Syria, a town in northern Syria
 Al-Dana, Maarrat al-Nu'man, a town in northwestern Syria

Turkey 
 Dana Island
 Ancient Dana or Tyana in Cappadocia, capital of a Neo-Hittite kingdom in the 1st millennium BC
 Ancient Dana possibly associated with Tynna in Cappadocia

United States 
 Dana, California, an uninsorporated communití in Shasta County
 Dana, Illinois, a town in Illinois
 Dana, Indiana, a town in Indiana
 Dana, Iowa, a town in Iowa
 Dana, Kentucky, a town in Kentucky
 Dana, Massachusetts, a former town that was disincorporated as part of the creation of the Quabbin Reservoir
 Mount Dana, a mountain peak in Yosemite National Park, California
 Dana Meadows (California), meadows at the foot of Mount Dana
 Dana Point, California, a city in Southern California
 Dana Butte, in the Grand Canyon, Arizona

Enterprises 
 Dàna, an independent online Scottish Gaelic periodical
 Dana (company), a beverage company from Mirna, Slovenia
 Dana Air, a Nigerian airline
 Dana Centre, opened in 2003, an event venue in London, England
 Dana College, a former accredited college in Blair, Nebraska
 Dana Incorporated, a US-based auto parts firm
 Dana Foundation, a private philanthropic foundation founded by Charles A. Dana
 Dana Mall, a shopping mall in Manama, Bahrain
 House of Dana, a perfumery founded in Barcelona, Spain, by Javier Serra in 1932

Religion 
 Dāna, the practice of generosity or giving in Dharmic religions
 Danu (Irish goddess) (Dana in modern Irish), the Celtic mother goddess

Ships 
 Dana (1919), Danish research vessel 1920–1921
 Dana (1921), Danish research vessel 1921–1935
 Dana (1937), Danish research vessel 1937–1980
 Dana (1980), Danish research vessel 1981-present

Other uses 
 152mm SpGH DANA, a Czech artillery gun
 Dana octopus squid, a deep sea dwelling squid
 HM Prison Shrewsbury, a former UK prison referred to locally as "The Dana"
 ZAZ Dana, a model of ZAZ automobile
 Dana Freeling, a character in the film Poltergeist (1982)

See also 
 Dana–Farber Cancer Institute, a Boston, Massachusetts-based cancer treatment and research center
 D'Anna (disambiguation)
 Danna (disambiguation)
 Dannah